Jimtown is an unincorporated community in Vinton County, in the U.S. state of Ohio.

History
An early variant name of Jimtown was Pike Run. A post office called Pike Run was established in 1880, and remained in operation until 1909.

References

Unincorporated communities in Vinton County, Ohio
Unincorporated communities in Ohio